Football Queensland Sunshine Coast is the governing body of football (soccer) on the Sunshine Coast, Queensland. It is a member zone of Football Queensland and Football Federation Australia.

History

FQ Sunshine Coast was initially established as the North Coast Soccer Association in 1968.  Teams from Caloundra and Woombye were soon formed, joined later that year by Maroochydore and Beerwah (now Beerwah-Glasshouse United). Club numbers have continued to expand and as of 2018 the Sunshine Coast Football Zone now incorporates more than 6,000 players in 18 clubs stretching from Bribie Island in the south to Gympie in the North.

As part of the reform journey, the local football community was invited to engage in a six-month state-wide consultation process based on improving four key areas of the game: Governance, Administration, Competitions and Affordability.

Member Clubs

Former clubs

Men's Football

Men's A Grade/1st Division/Premier League – History

Ref:

Men's A Grade/1st Division/Premier League – Summary

Ref:

Men's A Grade/1st Division/Premier League – Premiership/Grand Final Double

Women's/Ladies Football

Women's/Ladies Senior Competition – History

Women's/Ladies Senior Competition – Summary

Women's/Ladies Senior Competition – Premiership/Grand Final Double

Awards

Player of the Year - Female & Male

Ref:

Seniors – Most Goals Scored – Male & Female
In late-1970 Charlie Rocker, who was a prolific scorer for Woombye was killed.  The Charlie Rocker Memorial Trophy was established in 1971 to recognise the senior male player who had scored the most goals in the season.  The inaugural winner was Ray Dann of Beerwah-Glasshouse United.  Fittingly, Charlie's brother Horst won the trophy in 1973 and his nephew Scott first won the award for most goals scored in 1998; winning the award 6 times.

 The 17 goals scored by Ray Dann in 1971 is based on incomplete newspaper reports
 The 16 goals scored by Dick Watson in 1974 is based on incomplete newspaper reports and includes 3 goals scored against Redcliffe who withdrew from the competition after 4 rounds.

Ref:

Australian Players
To date two players, both from the 1920s have played for Australia whilst playing on the then North Coast, now Sunshine Coast.

Wilfred Bratton (Australian Cap Number 12), 1922 
Wilfred Bratton (Australian Cap 12), who was usually referred to as Wilf Bratton (or even Bratten) was born in 1898 in England probably in or near Sheffield.  At the age of 15 Bratton migrated to Australia and settled at Flaxton or Palmwoods  where he was employed as a farmhand.  He enlisted for World War 1 in May 1915 as a Private and was wounded in service, a victim of gassing and severe trench fever.  He returned to Australia in March 1919.  In 1928 Bratton wrote to the newspapers about a game of football played between his 3rd Australian Division and the Royal Air Force at Ballieul (Somme on the Western Front) in the winter of 1917.

Bratton played for Palmwoods in August 1920 in their friendly games against Buderim before the formation of the North Coast Football Association (NCFA) in 1921.  In the first season of the NCFA in 1921 Bratton played for Mapleton.  Bratton continued to play for Mapleton until 1928 and was even club president.

In 1922, whilst playing for Mapleton Bratton was selected in the first Australian team which toured New Zealand from May to July that year.  Bratton scored the 2nd goal in the Australian team's first ever game against Wanganui (won 3–1)  and the equaliser in the second international against New Zealand played at Athletic Park in Wellington (drew 1–1).  All up Bratton played for Australia on 8 occasions scoring 3 goals.

Jack White (Australian Cap Number 20), 1923 
Jack White (Australian Cap 20) was born in Grafton N.S.W. and grew up in South Africa and moved to Nambour in the early-1920s where he was a sugar and citrus farmer.  White played football in South Africa as a junior, having represented his country at junior level.  In the inaugural North Coast Football Association season in 1921 White played for North Arm.  In 1923 White captained the powerful North Arm club and the North Coast representative side.  White was such a talent that in June 1923 he was lured to Brisbane to play for Pineapple Rovers.

In 1923, whilst playing for North Arm, White was selected to play for Queensland  and Australia  against the touring New Zealand side.  White made his Australian debut in June 1923 at the Brisbane Cricket Ground in a 2–1 win over New Zealand.  White represented Australia 3 times; in the 1923 internationals against New Zealand in Brisbane (won 2–1) and Sydney (lost 2–3)   and against the touring Canadian team in 1924 at the Brisbane Cricket Ground (won 3–2).

References

External links
Football Queensland official website
http://www.sunshinecoastfootball.com.au

Football Queensland
Soccer leagues in Queensland
Sports leagues established in 1968
1968 establishments in Australia
Sport in the Sunshine Coast, Queensland